Northcliffe may refer to:

People 

 Alfred Harmsworth, 1st Viscount Northcliffe, a press baron.

Places

Australia 

 Northcliffe, Queensland, a town on Facing Island in Gladstone Harbour in the Gladstone Region
 Northcliffe, Western Australia, a town in Western Australia.

United States 

Northcliffe, Texas, an unincorporated community in Harris County, Texas, United States.
Northcliffe Manor, Texas, an unincorporated community in Harris County, Texas, United States

Others 

Northcliffe Media, a newspaper publisher.